The women's uneven bars gymnastic event at the 2015 Pan American Games was held on July 14 at the Toronto Coliseum.

Schedule
All times are Eastern Standard Time (UTC-3).

Results

Qualification
Madison Desch and Megan Skaggs of the United States finished in 4th and 9th respectively, but did they not progress to the final because only two athletes per country can qualify for finals.

Final

References

Gymnastics at the 2015 Pan American Games
2015 in women's gymnastics